Schraalenburgh North Church, also known as North Church and as The Old North Reformed Church or Old Reformed Church, was founded in 1801 as a Dutch Reformed Church, in present-day Dumont, Bergen County, New Jersey, United States. The congregation was made up of those who originally were members of the South Schraalenburgh Church.

The cemetery contains burials of parishioners up to 1911, and a list of interments has been transcribed on the Internet by Bob Winship. As "North Church", the church was added to the National Register of Historic Places on May 26, 1983.

See also
 National Register of Historic Places listings in Bergen County, New Jersey

References

Churches in Bergen County, New Jersey
Dumont, New Jersey
Churches on the National Register of Historic Places in New Jersey
Reformed Church in America churches in New Jersey
Religious organizations established in 1801
Former Reformed Church in America churches
Former churches in New Jersey
1801 establishments in New Jersey
National Register of Historic Places in Bergen County, New Jersey
New Jersey Register of Historic Places